The Beach 105th Street station (signed as Beach 105th Street–Seaside station) is a station on the IND Rockaway Line of the New York City Subway, located at Beach 105th Street on the Rockaway Freeway in Queens. It is served by the Rockaway Park Shuttle at all times and ten daily rush-hour only A trains.

It is the least-used station out of all 424 stations in the New York City Subway system, serving 88,439 passengers in 2019, an average of fewer than 250 people per day.

History 
This station previously had six different names. It was originally opened by the Long Island Rail Road in 1880 as Seaside Station station (also an earlier name for Babylon) for the Rockaway Beach Branch at 102nd Street. It also included a trolley stop of the Ocean Electric Railway, as well as an OER spur to the Neponsit-Rockaway Beach Branch. A second station at Beach 104th Street became its replacement in April 1888, only to be burned on September 20, 1892.

The third station was built in 1892 and burned on August 29, 1893 during a storm, which ended up sparing the neighborhood around it. The fourth station was built in 1894 and renovated between April and May 1899. Like many of the stations on the Rockaway Beach and Far Rockaway Branches, it burned for a third time in 1941 and replaced with an elevated railroad station that opened in 1942.

A 1950 fire at The Raunt destroyed the trestle across Jamaica Bay, forcing the LIRR to reroute Rockaway Beach service along the Far Rockaway Branch through the Hammels Wye for the next five years. This station was closed on October 3, 1955, purchased by the New York City Transit Authority, rebuilt and reopened as a subway station on June 28, 1956.

In 1985, the station had only 262 paying daily riders on a typical weekday, not counting farebeaters, making it one of the least used stations in the system.

As part of the 2010–2014 Metropolitan Transportation Authority's Capital Program, new crossovers will be built at this station in order to provide resiliency in the event of major flooding, like from Hurricane Sandy. The crossovers would allow the station to be used as a terminal in the event that the terminal at Beach 116th Street was unavailable. In addition to the construction of the switches, a relay room will be built and new signals will be installed. Design work on the project started in August 2017, and finished in January 2019. Construction will start some time in the future.

Station layout

This elevated station has two tracks and two side platforms on a concrete viaduct. Both platforms have beige windscreens and canopies with green support columns in the center and full height fences at both ends. South of this station, the IND Rockaway Line descends to ground level.

Exits
The station's only entrance/exit is an elevated station house beneath the tracks. It has a station agent booth, turnstile bank, waiting area that allows a free transfer between directions, two staircases to each platform at the center, and two staircases going down to either side of Rockaway Freeway between Beach 105th and Beach 104th Streets. The two southern staircases are connected to the station house with a canopied overpass. The Rockaway Park-bound platform had an exit at the north end, which has been removed.

References

External links 

 
 Station Reporter — Rockaway Park Shuttle
 Seaside Station (Arrt's Arrchives):
 1905 image
 Former "SE" Cabin
 The Subway Nut — Beach 105th Street – Seaside Pictures 
 Entrance from Google Maps Street View
 Platforms from Google Maps Street View

IND Rockaway Line stations
Rockaway, Queens
New York City Subway stations in Queens, New York
Railway stations in the United States opened in 1956
1956 establishments in New York City